Rawblood is the 2016 debut horror novel by Catriona Ward. The book was first published in the United Kingdom on 24 September 2015 through Weidenfeld & Nicolson. The novel is published in the USA March 1, 2017 by Sourcebooks, as The Girl From Rawblood.

Synopsis
At the book's start Iris Villarca is an eleven-year-old girl growing up in Dartmoor during 1910. She and her father live in a mansion named Rawblood, where he keeps her isolated from the general population. Iris's father justifies this isolation by stating that he fears that she will die from Horror autotoxicus. However, Horror autotoxicus, a term labelled by Paul Ehrlich, was in fact not a disease, but instead a theory about a mechanism of the human body to protect itself. But the father of Iris lies about this and says that Horror autotoxicus had caused her mother's death and had been a reoccurring ailment for the Villarca family. Despite this restriction Iris ends up befriending Tom Gilmore, only to find that their fathers are enemies. Iris's father discovers the relationship and tries to bribe her to stay away from Tom by paying for her tuition to medical school. She accepts the offer, but as time passes Iris begins reading in medicine books and finds out that her father has made up his statements about horror autotoxicus. After this she learns from him that there is in fact a disease that runs in the family that is much worse than the made up one.

Reception
Strange Horizons reviewed Rawblood favorably, praising it for "deliver[ing] all the mystery and menace that one might hope for in a classic ghost story." The Historical Novel Society also reviewed the work, calling the writing "powerful and atmospheric". WHSmith selected Rawblood as a Fresh Talent title for Autumn 2016.

Awards
August Derleth Award for Best Horror Novel (2016, won)
Author's Club Best First Novel Award  (2016, shortlisted)

References

2015 British novels
British horror novels
2010s horror novels
Fiction set in 1910
2015 debut novels
Novels set in Devon
Dartmoor
Weidenfeld & Nicolson books